Sunamganj-4 is a constituency represented in the Jatiya Sangsad (National Parliament) of Bangladesh since 2014 by Pir Fazlur Rahman of the Jatiya Party (Ershad).

Boundaries 
The constituency encompasses Bishwamvarpur and Sunamganj Sadar upazilas.

History 
The constituency was created in 1984 from a Sylhet constituency when the former Sylhet District was split into four districts: Sunamganj, Sylhet, Moulvibazar, and Habiganj.

Ahead of the 2008 general election, the Election Commission redrew constituency boundaries to reflect population changes revealed by the 2001 Bangladesh census. The 2008 redistricting altered the boundaries of the constituency.

Ahead of the 2014 general election, the Election Commission  reduced the boundaries of the constituency. Previously it had also included one union parishad of Dowarabazar Upazila: Mannargaon.

Members of Parliament

Elections 
Pir Fazlur Rahman was elected unopposed in the 2014 general election after opposition parties withdrew their candidacies in a boycott of the election.

Elections in the 2000s 
Momtaj Iqbal died in April 2009. Md. Matiur Rahman, of the Awami League, was elected in a June 2009 by-election.

Elections in the 1990s

References

External links
 

Parliamentary constituencies in Bangladesh
Sunamganj District